Fence is an American comic book series written by C. S. Pacat and drawn by Johanna the Mad; both of them are co-creators. The comic book focuses on Nicholas Cox, the illegitimate son of U.S. fencing Olympic champion Robert Coste, who aspires to become a fencing champion like his father. Despite being talented, he's roughly trained due to the hard conditions he grew up in. While at a competition, he's quickly beaten by the fencing prodigy Seiji Katayama and Nicholas vows to beat him. Managing to get into the elite boys school Kings Row on scholarship, Nicholas quickly finds out that Seiji is his roommate.

The comic book was first announced by Boom! Studios in August 2017 to be published under their Boom! Box imprint in November. Pacat was inspired to create Fence due to her love for the sport, which she practiced in high school, and her interest in sports manga like Haikyu!!.

The series has received a positive response from fans and critics; this positive response resulted in Boom! Studios promoting Fence from a limited series to an ongoing one. In August 2018, Boom! Studios announced that the series would change its format to original graphic novels. The last issue of the ongoing series was released in November 2018. The first original graphic novel, subtitled Rivals, was released June 30, 2020.

Plot 
Nicholas Cox, the illegitimate son of top fencer Robert Coste, and brother to Jesse Coste, is a wannabe fencer with a lot of natural talent but no professional training. In his first tournament match, his opponent is the legendary Seiji Katayama, who he is utterly trashed by- but not before they make a negative lasting impact on each other.

Fast forward a few months. Nicholas has been given a scholarship to Kings Row high school. His scholarship is for fencing, so him staying there depends on his being able to get on the team. Nicholas must go up against and defeat many other talented fencers for his spot, including Seiji himself. 

Nicholas is again unable to defeat Seiji, but does well enough to become one of the team's reserves along with Eugene Labao. Now that Seiji and Nicholas are teammates as well as roommates, they are forced to work together. Seiji gives Nicholas some pointers, apparently out of pure annoyance to the fact that Nicholas was such an untrained fencer.

Production

Development
Fence was first announced by Boom! Studios on August 17, 2017, to be released under their Boom! Box imprint. It was announced that the comic would be written by C. S. Pacat, writer of the Captive Prince trilogy, and drawn by Johanna the Mad. Regarding the collaboration between the two, Pacat stated that she had been a fan of Johanna for years, ever since she saw Johanna's fan art of Mulan. Similarly, one of the elements that draw Johanna to the project was the chance to work with Pacat, and also because she's interested in LGBTQ-related stories.

The first issue was given a November release date. One of the variant covers for issue one was drawn by Shanen Pae, the artist of Dream Daddy: A Dad Dating Simulator. On January 4, 2018, it was announced that Boom! Studios had upgraded Fence from a limited series to an ongoing series. Boom! Studios editor, Dafna Pleban, cited the positive response from "retailers, fans and press" as the main reason for upgrading Fence to an ongoing series.

Writing
Regarding her inspiration for Fence, Pacat revealed that she fenced épée in high school and fell in love with the sport; she particularly liked its psychological aspect, as fencers are required to make "split-second decisions with everything on the line". Another source of inspiration was her six-year stay in Japan. While there, she became interested in sports manga, including Haikyu!! and Hikaru no Go. Pacat worked with an épée coach to choreograph the fight scenes to develop the fencing characterization of each character and ensure they all have different strengths and weaknesses that can change with the narrative.

Regarding the portrayal of same-sex relationships within the story, Pacat stated that including queer characters and love stories within her stories is highly important to her. Additionally, she stated that she prefers to write "joyously and unabashedly queer" stories rather than sad ones. She also noted that quite often, sports anime, manga and comics are very "het masculine" and often exclude queer characters.

Reception

Critical response

Fence has received a positive response from critics. On review aggregator website Comic Book Roundup, the comic has an average rating of 7.7 out of 10, based on 23 reviews, indicating favorable reviews.

Reviewing the first issue, Kat Calamia from Newsarama gave it a score of 8 out of 10, saying that "it kept [her] entertained with its character building and peek into the world of fencing", further stating the issue's cliffhanger had her hooked regarding the future of Nicholas and Seiji's rivalry.

Sales
In October 2017, Shanen Pae's variant cover of Fence #1 was 17th most advance reordered comic book, while the main cover ranked 24th (out of the top 25 advance reorders).

References

Boom! Studios titles
2017 comics debuts
LGBT-related comics
Sports comics
2010s LGBT literature
LGBT literature in the United States